El Amria is a town in the Aïn Témouchent province in northwestern Algeria.

References 

Communes of Aïn Témouchent Province